Grigor Dimitrov was the defending champion, but chose to play in the US Open instead.
Cedrik-Marcel Stebe defeated Amir Weintraub 7–5, 6–1 to win the tournament.

Seeds

Draw

Finals

Top half

Bottom half

References
 Main Draw
 Qualifying Draw

Singles
Chang-Sat Bangkok Open - Singles
 in Thai tennis